Brock D. Dykxhoorn (born July 2, 1994) is a Canadian professional baseball pitcher for the Uni-President Lions of the Chinese Professional Baseball League (CPBL). He previously played in the KBO League for the SK Wyverns and Lotte Giants.

Career

Amateur career
Dykxhoorn attended St. Anne's Catholic Secondary School in Clinton, Ontario, and Central Arizona College.

Houston Astros
The Houston Astros selected Dykxhoorn in the sixth round of the 2014 Major League Baseball draft, and signed him for a $250,000 signing bonus.

After signing, Dykxhoorn was assigned to the Greeneville Astros where he went 3–3 with a 4.31 ERA in 12 games. In 2015, he played for the Quad Cities River Bandits, posting an 8–5 record and 3.88 ERA. He was promoted to the Lancaster JetHawks for the 2016 season where he went 10–4 with a 5.02 ERA in a career high 123.2 innings pitched. He spent the 2017 season with the Corpus Christi Hooks, going 3–5 with a 4.62 ERA in 25 games pitched. He was released by the Astros organization on November 13, 2018.

SK Wyverns
On November 16, 2018, he signed with SK Wyverns of the KBO League.

On March 26, 2019, Dykxhoorn made his KBO debut. He was waived on June 3, 2019.

Lotte Giants
On June 9, 2019, Dykxhoorn was claimed off waivers by the Lotte Giants of the KBO League. After the season, October 13, 2019, he was selected Canada national baseball team at the 2019 WBSC Premier12.

Uni-President Lions
On June 23, 2020, Dykxhoorn signed with the Uni-President Lions of the Chinese Professional Baseball League. Dykxhoorn won the 2020 Taiwan Series with the Lions and re-signed with the team for the 2021 season. In 27 games, he posted an impressive 1.83 ERA, 0.89 WHIP, and accumulated 4.56 WAR over 181.2 innings. On January 5, 2022, Dykxhoorn re-signed with the Lions for the 2022 season. On August 8, it was announced that Dykxhoorn would undergo back surgery to repair a herniated disc and miss 3 months, and likely the remainder of the season. In 12 starts for the team, Dykxhoorn logged a 3-3 record and 2.96 ERA with 50 strikeouts in 73.0 innings pitched.

On December 17, 2022, Dykxhoorn re-signed with the Lions for the 2023 season.

References

External links

1994 births
Living people
Baseball people from Ontario
Baseball players at the 2015 Pan American Games
Canada national baseball team players
Canadian expatriate baseball players in South Korea
Canadian expatriate baseball players in Taiwan
Canadian expatriate baseball players in the United States
Canadian people of Dutch descent
Central Arizona Vaqueros baseball players
Corpus Christi Hooks players
Fresno Grizzlies players
Greeneville Astros players
KBO League pitchers
Lancaster JetHawks players
Pan American Games gold medalists for Canada
Pan American Games medalists in baseball
People from Goderich, Ontario
Quad Cities River Bandits players
SSG Landers players
Uni-President Lions players
West Virginia Mountaineers baseball players
2019 WBSC Premier12 players
Medalists at the 2015 Pan American Games